The Grambling State Tigers men's basketball team represents Grambling State University in Grambling, Louisiana.  The school's team currently competes in the Southwestern Athletic Conference. Grambling State has never qualified for the NCAA Division I Tournament since transitioning from Division II. They currently play their home games at the Fredrick C. Hobdy Assembly Center.

History
The glory years of the Tigers were led by Fred Hobdy, who led the Tigers to eight SWAC regular season titles (five outright) during his coaching tenure. Hobdy went 572-288 as head coach from 1957 to 1986, which saw them play in NCAA Division II and the NAIA. They reached the Elite Eight of the Division II tournament in 1958 and won the NAIA title in 1961. Notable players during this time were Willis Reed, who was an NAIA All-American before becoming drafted by the New York Knicks; Reed was inducted into the Naismith Memorial Basketball Hall of Fame in 1982. 

The Tigers advanced to the final round of the SWAC men's basketball tournament for the first time in program history in 2011 but lost to Alabama State. The 2012–13 team became the eighth NCAA Division I team to finish a season winless. They are one of only two teams of the SWAC to have never qualified for the NCAA Division I Tournament along with one of three SWAC teams to have never won the SWAC Tournament. The Tigers returned to the SWAC Tournament title game in 2023 to compete against Texas Southern for the right to advance to the NCAA Tournament.

Postseason results

NIT results

The Tigers have appeared in one National Invitation Tournament (NIT). Their record is 0–1.

CollegeInsider.com Postseason Tournament (CIT) results

The Tigers have appeared in one CollegeInsider.com Postseason Tournament (CIT). Their record is 0–1.

NCAA Division II Tournament results
The Tigers have appeared in two NCAA Division II Tournaments. Their combined record is 3–2.

NAIA Tournament results
The Tigers have appeared in seven NAIA Tournaments. Their combined record is 15–6 and were NAIA national champions in 1961.

See also
List of NCAA Division I men's basketball programs

References

External links
Website